Hiki may refer to:

Hurricane Hiki, the wettest tropical cyclone on record in the United States
Hiki District, Saitama, a district in Saitama Prefecture, Japan
Kii-Hiki Station, a railway station in Shirahama, Nishimuro District, Wakayama Prefecture, Japan
Hiki Yoshikazu (died 1203), Japanese warrior-noble of the Kamakura period related to the ruling Minamoto clan through his daughter's marriage

See also
Haikai
Heiki
Heikki
Hikki (disambiguation)
Ohiki